Sayyid Abdolkarim Mousavi Ardebili (28 January 1926 – 23 November 2016) was an Iranian reformist politician and Twelver shi'a marja.

Political career
Ardebili was a supporter of Ayatollah Ruhollah Khomeini and was a friend of his. He made speeches in support of Khomeini in the 1970s. After the Iranian Revolution, he became a founding member of the Islamic Republican party that was founded in 1979. Khomeini appointed him as chief of justice in 1981 after the impeachment of President Abulhassan Banisadr. As chief justice, he served as member of the temporary council of the Presidency, along with the Prime Minister and Speaker, carrying out the duties of the president for up to two months.

References

External links
Is the Ayatullah a Heretic?, Time,  Monday, 28 April 1980

1926 births
2016 deaths
People from Ardabil
Chief justices of Iran
Al-Moussawi family
People of the Iranian Revolution
Members of the Assembly of Experts
Central Council of the Islamic Republican Party members
Council of the Islamic Revolution members
Members of the Assembly of Experts for Constitution